Temuco Formation a sedimentary formation near the city of Temuco in southern Chile. The formation crops out in the western part of Labranza Basin at the footfills of the Chilean Coast Range. It overlies the Bahía Mansa Metamorphic Complex and underlies sediments of Holocene age. The formation is thought to represent ancient river systems of low and intermediated energy near an area of volcanism around cerro Ñielol.

References 

Geologic formations of Chile
Miocene Series of South America
Oligocene Series of South America
Eocene Series of South America
Neogene Chile
Paleogene Chile
Sandstone formations
Siltstone formations
Fluvial deposits
Geology of Araucanía Region